The Transitional Executive Council (TEC) was a multiparty body in South Africa that was established by law to facilitate the transition to democracy, in the lead-up to the country's first non-racial election in April 1994.

As part of the multi-party negotiations that ended apartheid, the African National Congress (ANC) pushed for the creation of a body that would ensure a level playing field, arguing that the governing National Party would not be impartial, as it would also be contesting the election.

The TEC was created by the Transitional Executive Council Act, 1993, and consisted of one member of each of the parties that participated in the negotiations, with the notable exceptions of the Pan Africanist Congress (PAC); and the Freedom Alliance, an alliance of right-wing and black groups such as the Inkatha Freedom Party who had abandoned the negotiation process.

The TEC consisted of 19 people, one each from the 19 groups that participated in the negotiations, and it had a number of subcouncils. The subcouncils focused on particular areas, such as stability and security, intelligence, and law and order, with members appointed because of specific expertise, and they received instructions from the TEC. TEC subcouncils had the power to curtail government actions, to access information relevant to their purposes, and to review and reject legislation passed by the Tricameral Parliament of South Africa, and the Bantustans if it deemed that these laws would hamper the attainment of democratic elections.

Although State President F. W. De Klerk downplayed the role of the TEC after its first sitting on 7 December 1993, Cyril Ramaphosa, who represented the ANC on the body, said that it marked the end of minority rule in South Africa. The TEC was the first time that black South Africans played a major role in the governance of the country, and among its actions was the dismissal of the Ciskei government, after its collapse in March 1994, and the appointment of two administrators for the territory, and it took control of Boputhatswana, along with the South African government, after the government of Lucas Mangope refused to give assurances that it would permit free and fair elections in the territory.

References

External links
"Transitional Executive Council Act, 1993"

Democratization
Peace processes
1993 establishments in South Africa
1994 disestablishments in South Africa
Political history of South Africa
Government of South Africa
Defunct organisations based in South Africa